Dayanand Anglo-Vedic Public School is a private school in Thane, Maharashtra, India. The school was founded in 1995 at Balkum, Thane, but was moved to Tulsidham in 2004. It is one of a number of schools run by the Dayanand Anglo-Vedic College Trust and Management Society which first started in Lahore. It follows the Central Board of Secondary Education (CBSE) pattern of education. The school caters for children from nursery through to Standard Ten.

The school hosted Khoj, an International Science Festival, for three consecutive years.

Staff 
 Principal: Mrs. Simmi juneja 
 Secondary Coordinator: Mrs. Poonam Singh
 Primary Coordinator: Mrs. Sharmila Ray.
 Cultural Coordinator: Mrs. Amrita Potdar

Education 
D.A.V. Public School follows the DAV Publication Books through to Std. VIII. Std. IX and X follow the NCERT publication books. A D.A.V. Board exam is held for Std. VIII while a CBSE Board is held for Std. X. Question papers for students studying in Standard IX of all DAV Schools are common. The School secured a 100% pass rate for the tenth consecutive year in the STD X AISSE (All India Secondary School Examination) 2007-08.

Infrastructure
It is a five-story structure with a canteen and a playground that has been rented by Tulsidham to the authorities. It has a science laboratory. There is also a computer laboratory with over 50 computers. The classrooms from the two wings of the fifth floor, computer lab are airconditioned. On the fourth floor, there was a conference room, with air-conditioning, that was used for all major events and workshops hosted for the students but is now converted into classrooms due to the partial demolition of the fifth floor. Instead, a herbal nursery has been converted to a raised platform which is now used for hosting most of the major events and workshops for the students. The school is getting two new floors with possibilities of classes XI and XII.

Sports and co-curricular activities
The school's sports teams enter tournaments like the Mahatma Hansraj and CBSE Sports Tournament. The school encourages co-curricular activities and holds at least one competition each month. Their annual sports meet is held at Sri Ma Vidyalaya ground in Hiranandani Estate, Thane but was held at Dadoji Kondev Stadium for session 2016-2017

References

External links
Official website

Educational institutions established in 1995
Education in Thane
Schools affiliated with the Arya Samaj
Schools in Thane district
1995 establishments in Maharashtra